"Reminding Me (Of Sef)" is the second single from rapper Common's third album One Day It'll All Make Sense. It features vocals from Chantay Savage and keyboards played by Spike Rebel. Its Ynot produced beat samples "Mellow Mellow Right On" by Lowrell and "Remind Me" by Patrice Rushen. A music video directed by Darren Grant was made for the song.

Track listing

US version

A-side
 "Reminding Me (Of Sef) (Radio Edit)" (4:20)
 "Reminding Me (Of Sef) (Album Version)" (4:57)
 "Reminding Me (Of Sef) (Instrumental)" (4:56)\

B-side
 "1'2 Many... (Radio Version)" (3:15)
 "1'2 Many... (Album Version)" (3:15)
 "Reminding Me (Of Sef) (Acapella)" (4:53)

International version

A-side
 "Reminding Me (Of Sef) - Album Version"
 "Reminding Me (Of Sef) - The Roots Remix"

B-Side
 "1'2 Many... (Album Version)"
 "I Used to Love H.E.R."

Chart positions

See also
List of Common songs

References

1997 singles
Common (rapper) songs
Music videos directed by Darren Grant
1997 songs
Relativity Records singles
Songs written by Common (rapper)